Vriesea arpocalyx is a species of plant in the family Bromeliaceae. It is endemic to Ecuador.  Its natural habitats are subtropical or tropical moist montane forests and subtropical or tropical dry shrubland, at altitudes of 1500–3000 m. It is threatened by habitat loss, mostly through wildfires.

References

Flora of Ecuador
arpocalyx
Near threatened plants
Taxonomy articles created by Polbot
Taxa named by Édouard André
Taxa named by Lyman Bradford Smith